Penicillium verhagenii is a species of fungus in the genus Penicillium which was isolated from Postel in Belgium.

References

verhagenii
Fungi described in 2014